Sheida Sangtarash (born 21 April 1984) is a Norwegian politician for the Socialist Left Party.

Sangtarash migrated to Norway from Iran as a teenager. In 2015, she was elected to Bærum municipal council. She served as a deputy representative to the Parliament of Norway from Akershus during the term 2017–2021.

References

1984 births
Living people
Bærum politicians
Deputy members of the Storting
Socialist Left Party (Norway) politicians
Iranian emigrants to Norway
21st-century Norwegian politicians